Stavanger Health Trust is a health trust which serves southern Rogaland. Its main facility is  Stavanger University Hospital, as well as local clinics and institutions around Rogaland. The trust was formed on 1 January 2002 as a result of the national health reforms and is owned by Western Norway Regional Health Authority

External links 
 

Health trusts of Norway